The Hualien Railway Culture Park is a gallery in Hualien City, Hualien County, Taiwan.

History
The site used to be the Hualien Branch Office of the Railway Department in which it was the headquarters that controlled the Taitung line, originally constructed in 1932. The office was then renovated into a cultural park named Hualien Railway Culture Park.

Exhibition

The gallery exhibits the artifacts of Taiwan's narrow-gauge railway base and the history of the Eastern Line.

Transportation
The area is accessible southeast of Hualien Station of Taiwan Railways.

See also
 List of tourist attractions in Taiwan

References

1932 establishments in Taiwan
Buildings and structures in Hualien County
Tourist attractions in Hualien County
Hualien City